Pūkeko Pictures is a New Zealand based entertainment company. It produces a mix of live-action, animated, games and picture books for the global entertainment market.

It was created as a partnership between the co-founders of Weta Workshop, Richard Taylor and Tania Rodger; and author, illustrator and producer Martin Baynton.

Their first collaboration was Jane and the Dragon, a CGI TV series about a girl and her pet dragon. Their subsequent television series The WotWots was nominated in 2012 for "Best Animated Television Production – Preschool" in the 2012 Annie Awards.

Clive Spink was appointed as Chief Executive Officer in 2015. In 2012, the studio inked a first look deal with FremantleMedia.

Jeremy Hall was appointed as Head of Development & Strategy in 2018

Works
Hundred99 Little Heroes, shortform documentary
Book Hungry Bears, animated TV series
Kiddets, animated TV series
Jane and the Dragon, animated TV series
Cleverman, live action adult drama
The WotWots, animated children's TV series, 2009
Thunderbirds Are Go, animated TV series
The Changeover, live action feature film

References

External links
Official page

Companies based in Wellington
Film production companies of New Zealand
Special effects companies
New Zealand animation studios